Attorney General Quinn may refer to:

John Quinn (advocate) (born 1954), Attorney General of the Isle of Man
Robert H. Quinn (1928–2014), Attorney General of Massachusetts

See also
General Quinn (disambiguation)